Gibraltar United F.C. is a football team from Gibraltar. Founded in 1943 in the midst of World War II, they play in the Gibraltar Football League's Premier Division. In 2011 Gibraltar United joined forces with fellow local club Lions Football Club, with the club's new name Lions Gibraltar FC who played in Gibraltar's Premier Division. In 2014 the club announced their reformation as an independent club and played in the Gibraltar Football League's second tier once again in the 2014–15 season, winning promotion as champions.

History
The club was founded by Aurelio Louis Danino a Gibraltarian journalist whose nom de plume was "Lubinox". The team was made up of local Gibraltarians who remained on the rock during the Second World War.  As most of the civilian population was evacuated putting a halt to league football in Gibraltar over the war years, Gibraltar United would represent Gibraltarians and play against the UK based regiments and other military units serving in Gibraltar winning the Governor's Cup in their founding year of 1943. Once competitive football resumed on the Rock in 1946, United sealed their first league title. The club would dominate the next 10 years under Danino's presidency before entering a dry spell, winning a few more titles in the early 1960s with their last league title in 2001–02 - the last league title won by a side other than Lincoln Red Imps for 15 years before Europa's triumph in the 2016–17 season.

Despite the triumph in 2002 breaking nearly 50-year without success at the club (aside from 3 consecutive Rock Cup victories from 1999 to 2001), the club quickly began to see a decline in fortunes against the continued dominance of Lincoln, and rumours began to emerge that the historic club was close to ceasing operations, amidst talk of a rumour with lower-level club Lions FC to retain Gibraltar United's Premier Division place and adopt Lions' youth program. After merging with Lions in 2011 to form Lions Gibraltar, the club established itself as a mid-table Gibraltar Premier Division side. However, in 2014, after the Gibraltar Football Association was accepted into UEFA, the club became independent of Lions once again and competed in the Gibraltar Second Division. After a tight race with Angels and Europa Point, the club won the title and promotion to the Gibraltar Premier Division for the 2015–16 season, building a squad with strong focus on Gibraltarian footballers and hiring Manolo Sanchez Nuñez as manager. A difficult first season saw them finish narrowly above the relegation playoff, with an 8th-place finish securing safety.

In April 2017, the club entered partnerships with Turicum Bank and former Real Madrid defender Michel Salgado, with the latter becoming one of the new owners of the club along with Dubai-based businessman Pablo Dana. With survival confirmed at the end of the season with a 7th-place finish, it was announced that Salgado would oversee youth trials in June, as well as arranging all transfers in preparation for the next season. United overvalued their squad and did away with their 'local only' policy for the start of the 17/18 season though they still retained around 50% of the squad as local players with a fair number of both full and Under 21 and Under 19 Internationals. Manolo Hierro also joined the club as director of football soon after the 17/18 season started.

After a 4th-place finish in the 2017–18 season, manager Manolo left the club. Lucas Cazorla was hired in his place. In July 2018, Gibraltar United made international headlines when it became the first football club in the world to pay players in part with cryptocurrency, through a sponsorship with Quantocoin. Pablo Domingo Fernandez and former Sevilla FC goalkeeper Antonio Notario Caro also joined the technical staff in July 2018. However, on 31 July 2019 it was reported that Dana had pulled his support from Gibraltar United and that several players had left the club, having not been paid for several months. The club denied these reports later that day, though, stating that Dana was still a part of the club. However, it was revealed on 7 August that the club had until the following Monday to repay all its debts or face expulsion from the newly formed Gibraltar National League.

Current squad
Squad as of 23 February 2019

Club staff

Achievements
 Gibraltar Premier Division (11)
 1947, 1948, 1949, 1950, 1951, 1954, 1960, 1962, 1964, 1965, 2002
 Gibraltar Second Division (2)
 1999, 2015
 Rock Cup (4)
 1947, 1999, 2000, 2001

References

Football clubs in Gibraltar
Association football clubs established in 1943
1943 establishments in Gibraltar